Prolepsis may refer to:

 Prolepsis (rhetoric), a figure of speech in which the speaker raises an objection and then immediately answers it
Prolepsis (literary), anticipating action, a flash forward, see Foreshadowing
 Cataphora, using an expression or word that co-refers with a later expression in the discourse
 Flashforward, in storytelling, an interjected scene that represent events in the future
 Prolepsis, one of the three criteria of truth in Epicureanism
 Prolepsis (fly), a genus of robber flies
 Prolepsis (album), by Arrogance

See also 
Déjà vu, the experience of feeling sure that one has already witnessed or experienced a current situation
 Paralipsis, providing full details or drawing attention to something while pretending to pass it over
 Proleptic (disambiguation)

pt:Prolepse